The 2019–20 season was S.P.A.L.'s third season in the top-flight of Italian football since 1968. After being promoted as champions of Serie B in the 2016–17 season, SPAL finished just above the relegation places in 17th during the 2017–18 season, and in 13th place during the 2018–19 Serie A season.

The season was coach Leonardo Semplici's sixth in charge of the club, after taking over in December 2014. On 10 June 2019 Semplici and his staff extended their contracts with the club to June 2021.

Players

Squad information

Transfers

In

Loans in

Out

Loans out

Pre-season and friendlies

Competitions

Serie A

League table

Results summary

Results by round

Matches

Coppa Italia

Statistics

Appearances and goals

|-
! colspan=14 style=background:#dcdcdc; text-align:center| Goalkeepers

|-
! colspan=14 style=background:#dcdcdc; text-align:center| Defenders

|-
! colspan=14 style=background:#dcdcdc; text-align:center| Midfielders

|-
! colspan=14 style=background:#dcdcdc; text-align:center| Forwards

|-
! colspan=14 style=background:#dcdcdc; text-align:center| Players transferred out during the season

Goalscorers

Last updated: 5 October 2019

Clean sheets

Last updated: 5 October 2019

Disciplinary record

Last updated: 5 October 2019

References

2019-20
SPAL